The 2019 San Jose State Spartans football team represented San Jose State University in the 2019 NCAA Division I FBS football season. The Spartans were led by third year coach Brent Brennan and played their home games at CEFCU Stadium. San Jose State was a member of the Mountain West Conference in the West Division. They finished the season 5–7, 2–6 in Mountain West play to finish in a three-way tie for fourth place in the West Division.

On June 5, 2019, San Jose State broke ground on its new Football Operations Building. The first phase of the project involved replacing the bleachers on the east side of the stadium with grass, which reduced the seating capacity by 8,936. It will be demolished and rebuilt along with the new Football Operations Building by 2023.

On September 21, 2019, San Jose State beat Arkansas for its first win over a Power 5 opponent since 2006.  This was also San Jose State's first ever win over an opponent from the Southeastern Conference.

Previous season
 
The Team finished in last place in the West Division with a 1–11 record and a conference record of 1–7 in Mountain West play for the second straight year.

Recruiting

Position Key

Recruits

Preseason

Mountain West media days
The Mountain West media days were held from July 23–24, 2019 at Green Valley Ranch in Henderson, NV.

Media poll
The preseason poll was released at the Mountain West media days on July 23, 2019. The Spartans were predicted to finish in sixth place in the MW West Division.

Preseason All−Mountain West Team
The Spartans did not have any selections to the preseason All−Mountain West Team.

Personnel

Coaching staff

Schedule

Game summaries

Northern Colorado

Tulsa

at Arkansas

at Air Force

New Mexico

at Nevada

San Diego State

at Army

Boise State

at Hawaii

at UNLV

Fresno State

Awards and honors
Mountain West Conference Offensive Player of the Year - Josh Love, QB

All-Conference Team
First Team Offense
Josh Love, QB, Senior
Tre Walker, WR, Junior

Second-Team Defense
Ethan Aguayo, LB, Senior

Honorable Mentions
Bailey Gaither, WR, Senior
Troy Kowalski, OL, Senior
Matt Mercurio, PK, Freshman
Jack Snyder, OL, Junior

References

San Jose State
San Jose State Spartans football seasons
San Jose State Spartans football